Hugh Blessing-Boe (died 16 January 2018) was the fourth Bishop of Vanuatu, one of the nine dioceses  that make up the Anglican Church of Melanesia.

Blessing Boe came from Vanuatu. He was Principal of the Bishop Patteson Theological College from 1986 to 1995; He was consecrated bishop on 29 June 2000 and served as Bishop of Vanuatu until his retirement in June 2006. He had degrees from the Universities of Birmingham and Auckland.

References

20th-century Anglican bishops in Oceania
Vanuatuan Anglican priests
Anglican bishops of New Hebrides, Vanuatu and New Caledonia
Diocese of Vanuatu and New Caledonia
Academic staff of Bishop Patteson Theological College
2018 deaths
Year of birth missing